Georges Gay (21 March 1926 – 8 July 1997) was a French professional racing cyclist. He rode in four editions of the Tour de France.

References

External links
 

1926 births
1997 deaths
French male cyclists
Sportspeople from Lot (department)
Cyclists from Occitania (administrative region)